Cody Fern (born 6 July 1988) is an Australian actor and director. Following his feature debut in The Tribes of Palos Verdes (2017), he portrayed murder victim David Madson in the FX series The Assassination of Gianni Versace: American Crime Story (2018). Later that year, Fern played Michael Langdon in American Horror Story: Apocalypse. He appeared in the final season of the Netflix drama House of Cards as Duncan Shepherd. In 2019, he returned to American Horror Story for its ninth season 1984, playing Xavier Plympton. In 2021, he guest-starred in the tenth season, subtitled Double Feature, and has appeared in two episodes of the spin-off series American Horror Stories.

Early life and education
Fern was born on 6 July 1988 in Southern Cross in rural Western Australia. He attended boarding school at Merredin Senior High School, and graduated from Curtin University of Technology with an Honours Degree in Commerce in 2009.

Career
Fern had initially considered a career in finance before pursuing acting. According to an interview with Anthem Magazine, he hated his life while working in finance. He said, "This is not what I want my life to be. But I'm here and I'm doing it and I'm trying to fit in." It was the Cate Blanchett-starring film duology Elizabeth and Elizabeth: The Golden Age that made him want to become an actor.

Fern has trained with acting coaches, including Ellen Burstyn, Larry Moss, and Susan Batson. Fern played the lead role of Albert in the National Theatre of Great Britain's production War Horse, which received critical acclaim.

In 2011, Fern played Romeo in Shakespeare WA's production of Romeo and Juliet, Lindsay in the Black Swan Theatre Company's Jandamarra, and the Earl of Southampton in the world premiere production of The Enchanters at the State Theatre of Western Australia. He has appeared in a number of short films, including the Western Australian Screen Award-winning film Still Take You Home (2010) and The Last Time I Saw Richard (2014).

In 2014, Fern was the recipient of the annual Heath Ledger Scholarship by Australians in Film, an award aimed at financially and professionally supporting actors of Australian descent. This includes, besides a cash fund, a two-year scholarship at Los Angeles' Stella Adler Academy of Acting and Theatre and mentorship from the father of actor Heath Ledger.

He appeared as Jim Mason in The Tribes of Palos Verdes and wrote, directed and starred in the short film Pisces opposite Keir Gilchrist in 2017. In a Los Angeles Times sit-down interview, Fern had planned to take an 18-month hiatus from acting to focus on Pisces when Versace came along.

In 2018, Fern made his television debut in the acclaimed FX true crime anthology series The Assassination of Gianni Versace: American Crime Story as David Madson which earned him the Gold Derby TV Award for Movie/Limited Series Supporting Actor and a nomination for Breakthrough Performer of the Year. He was announced to star in the series regular role of Duncan Shepherd on the final season of House of Cards. The same year, Fern portrayed the Antichrist Michael Langdon in the eighth season of FX horror anthology series American Horror Story, titled Apocalypse. In 2019, Fern played Xavier Plympton in the ninth season of the show, American Horror Story: 1984.

In 2021, Fern portrayed Stan Vogel in American Horror Stories episode Feral, and Valiant Thor in American Horror Story, Double Feature: Death Valley. In 2022, he portrayed Thomas Browne in American Horror Stories episode Milkmaids. In 2022 Fern played a priest named Jacob in the film Father Stu.

Filmography

Film

Television

Video Games

References

External links 

 

Living people
21st-century Australian male actors
Australian male film actors
Australian male television actors
Australian male stage actors
Male actors from Western Australia
People from Southern Cross, Western Australia
Curtin University alumni
1988 births